German submarine U-884 was a Type IXD/42 U-boat of Nazi Germany's Kriegsmarine during World War II. Her construction was ordered on 2 April 1942 and her keel was laid down on 29 August 1943 by DeSchiMAG AG Weser of Bremen.

She was launched on 17 May 1944, but was never commissioned, and was badly damaged on 30 March 1945 by United States bombs.

Design
German Type IX/D42 submarines were considerably larger than the original Type IXs. U-884 had a displacement of  when at the surface and  while submerged. She had two shafts and two  propellers.

U-884 was fitted with six  torpedo tubes (four fitted at the bow and two at the stern), 24 torpedoes, one  SK C/32 naval gun, 150 rounds, and a  Flak M42 with 2575 rounds as well as two  C/30 anti-aircraft guns with 8100 rounds. The boat had a complement of fifty-five.

References

Bibliography

German Type IX submarines
World War II submarines of Germany
1944 ships
Maritime incidents in March 1945